Bill Peak (1945 – December 23, 1996) was a Swimming coach from the United States. He is probably best known for having coached Mary T. Meagher to World Records in the women's 100 and 200 fly, while both were with Lakeside Swim Team in Louisville, Kentucky. Meagher held those World marks for 19 and 20 years, respectively; and as of 2014, her 2:05.96 time from 1981 still remains the US Open mark (fastest time on U.S. soil).

Peak coached at the following teams:
 Lakeside Swim Team, Louisville, KY (through 1984)
 Old Dominion Aquatic Club,  (1984–1993)
 Trinity Aquatics, Orlando, FL (1993–1996)

He was elected into the American Swimming Coaches Association's Hall of Fame in 2007.

References 

1945 births
1996 deaths
American swimming coaches
Sportspeople from Louisville, Kentucky
Sportspeople from Norfolk, Virginia
Sportspeople from Orlando, Florida